Baeden Ty Choppy (born 14 April 1976 in Mackay, Queensland) is a former field hockey striker from Australia, who was a member of the Men's National Hockey Team that won the bronze medal at the 1996 Summer Olympics in Atlanta, Georgia.

Since 2004, Baeden has been working as a player-coach to a hockey team competing in the North Premier League, England.
In 2017, Baeden returned to playing hockey in the Brisbane hockey league at the Kedron Wavell Wolves, re-uniting with former Olympics team-mate Matthew Smith (field hockey) who is the current top grade coach at that Club.

References
 Australian Olympic Committee

External links
 

1976 births
Australian male field hockey players
Male field hockey forwards
Olympic field hockey players of Australia
Field hockey players at the 1996 Summer Olympics
1998 Men's Hockey World Cup players
Living people
Australian field hockey coaches
Olympic bronze medalists for Australia
Sportspeople from Mackay, Queensland
Olympic medalists in field hockey
Indigenous Australian Olympians
Indigenous Australian field hockey players
Medalists at the 1996 Summer Olympics
Field hockey people from Queensland